is a Japanese film director and screenwriter.

Filmography

Director

1982 Yamiutsu shinzo a.k.a. Heart, Beating in the Dark
1988 Rock yo shizukani nagareyo
1988 Yojo no jidai
1989 Yuwakusha a.k.a. The Enchantment
1992 Saigo no drive
1993 Nurse Call
1996 Romansu a.k.a. Some Kinda Love
1998 Doggusu a.k.a. Dogs
1999 Shikoku
2001 Yawaraka na hou a.k.a. A Tender Place
2005 Yamiutsu shinzo a.k.a. Heart, Beating in the Dark
2005 8-gatsu no Kurisumasu (Christmas in August)
2007 Black Belt Known in Japan as Kuro-Obi【黒帯】.
2022 How to Find Happiness

References

External links
 

Japanese film directors
Living people
1956 births
People from Kanagawa Prefecture
People from Yokohama